There is no county-wide local education authority in Merseyside, instead education services are provided by the five smaller metropolitan boroughs of Knowsley, Liverpool, Sefton, St Helens and Wirral:

List of schools in Knowsley
List of schools in Liverpool
List of schools in Sefton
List of schools in St Helens
List of schools in Wirral

See also
Middle Schools in England
Education in England
List of UK Independent Schools
Office for Standards in Education
List of the oldest schools in the United Kingdom
List of places in Merseyside

Merseyside